Valls is a municipality in Catalonia, Spain.

Valls may also refer to:

UE Valls, Spanish football club
Battle of Valls, battle of the Peninsular War
Les Valls de Valira, municipality in Catalonia, Spain
De Valls Bluff, Arkansas, town in the United States

People
Josep Bargalló i Valls (born 1958), Spanish philologist
Carme Valls (born 1945), Spanish endocrinologist and politician
Carmen Valls (born 1926), Spanish fencer
Clàudia Valls, Spanish and Portuguese mathematician
Dino Valls (born 1959), Spanish painter
Francisco Valls, Spanish composer and music theorist
Jordi Valls i Pozo (born 1970), Spanish poet
Jorge Valls (born 1933), Cuban activist and poet
Manuel Valls (born 1962), French politician
Manuel Valls (composer) (1920–1984), Spanish composer
Oriol Valls (born 1947), American academic and physicist
Rafael Valls (born 1987), Spanish cyclist
Sergio Armando Valls (born 1941), Mexican jurist

Catalan-language surnames